Asian Brazilians refers to Brazilian citizens or residents of Asian ancestry. The vast majority trace their origins to Western Asia, particularly Lebanon, or East Asia, namely Japan. The Brazilian census does not use "Asian" as a racial category, though the term "yellow" (amarela in Portuguese) refers to people of East Asian ethnic origin. 

Beyond the descendants from West Asia and East Asia, there has also been much smaller immigration from Southeast Asia and South Asia, as well as those from the Asian diaspora in the Caribbean and Mozambique.

Brazil has the largest community of Japanese descendants outside of Japan. Japanese immigrants started to move to Brazil in 1908, were directed to the Brazilian coffee plantations.

History
Recent research has suggested that Asians from the early Portuguese Eastern Empire, known as Luso-Asians first came to Brazil during the sixteenth century as seamen known as Lascars, or as servants, slaves and concubines accompanying the governors, merchants and clergy who has served in Portuguese Asia. 

The first substantial Asian immigration to Brazil were a small number of Chinese people (3,000) during the colonial period as coolie slaves. Later waves of Chinese immigrants would come from Hong Kong and Macau, the latter being a former Portuguese colony, as well as China's ethnic Russian community during the 1950s.

Later, significant immigration from Asia to Brazil would start in the late 19th century, when immigration from Lebanon and Syria became important. Until 1922, Levantine immigrants were considered "Turks", as they carried passports issued by the Turkish Ottoman Empire, which then ruled over present-day Lebanon. Various estimates for Lebanese ancestry in Brazil place them at about 7 million.

Another important Asian immigrant group to Brazil were from Japan. The first Japanese immigrants arrived in Brazil in 1908. Until the 1950s, more than 250 thousand Japanese immigrated to Brazil. Currently, the Japanese-Brazilian population is estimated at 2.1 million people. It is the largest ethnic Japanese population outside Japan, followed closely by the Japanese community in the United States. 

Other East Asian groups are also significant in Brazil. The Korean Brazilian population is estimated to be 50,000, and the Chinese Brazilian population around 250,000. Over 70% of Asian Brazilians are concentrated in the state of São Paulo. There are significant populations in Paraná, Pará, Mato Grosso do Sul, and other parts of Brazil.

Japanese in Brazil

Restrictions on Asian immigrants
Although discussions were situated in a theoretical field, immigrants arrived and colonies were founded through all this period (the rule of Pedro II), especially from 1850 on, particularly in the Southeast and Southern Brazil. These discussions culminated in the Decree 528 in 1890, signed by Brazil's first President Deodoro da Fonseca, which opened the national harbors to immigration except for Africans and Asians. This decree remained valid until 5 October 1892 when, due to pressures of coffee planters interested in cheap manpower, it was overturned by Law 97, which allowed the entry of Japanese immigrants to work on the coffee plantations, as until then, Brazilian immigration was almost exclusively from Europe.

See also
Arab Brazilians
Bangladeshi immigration to Brazil
Chinese Brazilians
Filipino immigration to Brazil
Indian immigration to Brazil
Japanese Brazilians
Korean Brazilians
Lebanese Brazilians
Russian Brazilians
Vietnamese Brazilians

Notes

References

 
 
Immigration to Brazil
Race in Brazil